The Post Oak Hotel & Tower, also popularly nicknamed the Fertitta Tower is a 36-story,  mixed-use skyscraper in Uptown Houston. The building operates a hotel, office space, residencies, and retail. The Post Oak serves as the headquarters for Fertitta Entertainment and its subsidiaries including Landry's, Inc., the Houston Rockets, and the Golden Nugget casinos. A penthouse room which houses Fertitta, the developer, is located in the building.

Features

Spa

The Spa at the Post Oak is a  spa. It is the only Forbes designated five-star spa in Texas. Its signature treatment, "Ritual of the Five Worlds" is only available in the spa. The owner, Tilman Fertitta, stated that he visited many of the best spas in the world in order to get inspired to deliver the best spa to the building. Other amenities in the spa include indoor pools and therapeutic tubs, treatment rooms equipped with showers, steam rooms and saunas, zero-gravity massage chairs, and a luxury fitness center.

Restaurants

Prior to the hotel's opening, the Landry's-owned restaurant chain Mastro's Steakhouse opened as the brand's flagship location. Other notable restaurants include Willie G's and Bloom and Bee.

An upscale cocktail bar named H Bar is located in the hotel's lobby and is notable for its $1,600 hamburger known as the "Black Gold" burger. A 30,000 wine cellar known as The Cellar is available for rent and features authentic tuscan-style decor. The wine selection is also available to be ordered at the property restaurants.

Media
The Fertitta Entertainment headquarters inside the Post Oak is the site for negotiating deals in TV-series Billion Dollar Buyer on CNBC. The series' second season featured episodes that showcased the development of the hotel tower.

References

Hotel buildings completed in 2018
Office buildings completed in 2018
Residential buildings completed in 2018
Residential skyscrapers in Houston
Skyscraper hotels in Houston
Skyscraper office buildings in Houston
2018 establishments in Texas